Siwinqani (Aymara siwinqa a kind of cactus, -ni a suffix, "the one with the siwinqa plant", also spelled Sehuencani) is a  mountain in the Bolivian Andes. It is located in the Cochabamba Department, Tapacari Province. Siwinqani lies northwest of Jach'a Ch'utu and Turu Qullu.

References 

Mountains of Cochabamba Department